19 Aquilae is a single star located  away from the Sun in the equatorial constellation of Aquila. 19 Aquilae is the Flamsteed designation. It is visible to the naked eye as a dim, yellow-white hued star with an apparent visual magnitude of 5.23. The star is moving closer to the Earth with a heliocentric radial velocity of −46.7 km/s.

This object has a stellar classification of F0 III-IV, with the luminosity class matching an evolving star transitioning from the subgiant to a giant stage. Poretti et al. (2003) list it as a suspected Gamma Doradus variable, and it is located near the cooler end of the instability strip on the Hertzsprung–Russell diagram. These spatial coordinates are a source of X-ray emission, which is most likely coming from the star.

19 Aquilae is an estimated 2.25 billion years old with a moderately high rate of spin, showing a projected rotational velocity of 57.0 km/s. It has 1.54 times the mass of the Sun and 2.50 times the Sun's radius. The star is radiating 12.8 times the luminosity of the Sun from its photosphere at an effective temperature of 6,784 K.

References

F-type giants
F-type subgiants
Gamma Doradus variables
Suspected variables
Aquila (constellation)
BD+05 4040
Aquilae, 19
178596
094068
7266